Penzance Central is an electoral division of Cornwall in the United Kingdom and returns one member to sit on Cornwall Council. The current Councillor is Cornelius Olivier, a Labour Party member.

Penzance Central was also a division of Penwith District Council between 1973 and 2009, and, as Penzance (Central), was a division of Cornwall County Council between 1973 and 1985, returning one member.

Cornwall Council division

Extent
Penzance Central covers the centre of the town of Penzance, including Morrab Gardens, the West Cornwall Hospital, Humphry Davy School, and Penwith College. The division covers 84 hectares in total.

Election results

2017 election

2013 election

2009 election

Cornwall County Council division

Election results

1981 election

1977 election

1973 election

References

Penzance
Electoral divisions of Cornwall Council